Ina Kümmel (born 30 August 1967) is a former German cross-country skier who competed from 1990 to 1997. She finished eighth in the 4 × 5 km relay at the 1992 Winter Olympics in Albertville.

Kümmel's best finish at the FIS Nordic World Ski Championships was ninth in the 30 km event at Val di Fiemme in 1991. Her best World Cup finish was tenth twice (1990, 1995).

Kümmel's best individual career finish was second twice in lesser events at distances up to 10 km (1993, 1994).

Cross-country skiing results
All results are sourced from the International Ski Federation (FIS).

Olympic Games

World Championships

World Cup

Season standings

References

External links

Women's 4 x 5 km cross-country relay Olympic results: 1976-2002 

1967 births
Cross-country skiers at the 1992 Winter Olympics
German female cross-country skiers
Living people